Pinlebu Township  is a township in Kawlin District (formerly part of Katha District) in the Sagaing Division of Burma. The principal town is Pinlebu.

References

External links
Maplandia World Gazetteer - map showing the township boundary

Townships of Sagaing Region